Kevin Brady (born 1955) is an American politician.

Kevin Brady may also refer to:
 Kevin Brady (footballer) (born 1962), Irish former footballer
 Kevin Brady (public servant) (born 1947), 17th Controller and Auditor-General of New Zealand